Nosferatu pame, previously placed in the genus Herichthys, also known as labridens 'white' or mojarra caracolera blanca in Spanish, is a species of cichlid "endemic to the main stem and tributaries of the Rio Gallinas, including Rio Tamasopo, Ojo Frío, and Agua Buena, upriver from the Tamul cascade" in the Pánuco River Basin, San Luis Potosí, Mexico.

"This species is distinguished by its predorsal contour being gradual and acute, not concave before eye; dorsal and ventral contours straight to moderately convex, sloping slowly; intersection with caudal peduncle inconspicuous; mouth slightly angled downward. Ground color khaki when alive; snout, head, and opercles heavily dotted with tiny speckles, extending posteriorly onto nuchal area and base of dorsal fin. Eye diameter small (mean 23%, SD 1%), snout long (mean 39%, SD 2%), and cheeks shallow (mean 29%, SD 2%) (all in HL). Lower
pharyngeal plate stout and much broader than long; horns short with lightly pigmented stout molars, 2 central rows of 6–7 molars flank the midline, posterior-most 3 big and stout. The peritoneum uniformly very dark." It is found sympatric with Herichthys tamasopoensis and N. steindachneri

References

pame
Freshwater fish of Mexico
Endemic fish of Mexico
Pánuco River
Natural history of San Luis Potosí
Cichlid fish of North America
Fish described in 2013
Taxa named by Mauricio De la Maza-Benignos
Taxa named by María de Lourdes Lozano-Vilano